The mixed team archery competition at the 2014 Youth Summer Olympics took place from 22–24 August in Nanjing, China.

All 64 archers who qualified for the individual rounds entered the competition, which consisted of a 72-arrow 70m ranking round (60m for girls) followed by a knockout tournament based on the Olympic scoring system, with each match competed over four sets. Unlike other World Archery competitions, the mixed team competition is not competed by teams from the same nation, but from teams compiled on the basis of their total ranking round score in an attempt to make teams even.

Schedule
All times are UTC+08:00.

Results

Ranking rounds

Elimination rounds

Finals

Top half

Section 1

Section 2

Bottom half

Section 3

Section 4

References

 

Archery at the 2014 Summer Youth Olympics